Runzhou or Run Prefecture was a zhou (prefecture) in imperial China in modern Jiangsu, China, seated in modern Zhenjiang. It existed (intermittently) from 595 to 1113, when it became Zhenjiang Prefecture.

Geography
The administrative region of Runzhou in the Tang dynasty falls within modern Jiangsu: 
Under the administration of Zhenjiang:
Zhenjiang
Jurong
Danyang
Under the administration of Changzhou:
Changzhou (Jintan District)
Under the administration of Nanjing:
Nanjing (Jiangning District)

References
 

Prefectures of the Sui dynasty
Prefectures of the Tang dynasty
Prefectures of Yang Wu
Prefectures of Southern Tang
Liangzhe West Circuit
Former prefectures in Jiangsu